Andar is a village in Bihiya block of Bhojpur district in Bihar, India. As of 2011, its population was 1,790, in 265 households.

References 

Villages in Bhojpur district, India